Lee Seung-yuop (born 18 August 1976) is a retired baseball player and the current manager of the Doosan Bears. He spent most of his career with the Samsung Lions of the KBO League. At the age of 26, he became the youngest professional baseball player in the world to hit 300 home runs. He formerly held the Asian home run record of 56 homers in a season, established in 2003 while playing for Samsung in the KBO. The record was broken by Wladimir Balentien of the Tokyo Yakult Swallows, on September 15, 2013, when he hit his 56th and 57th Home Runs of the season against the Hanshin Tigers of the Nippon Professional Baseball League. He holds the KBO records for career home runs, runs scored, RBIs, total bases, and slugging percentage. Combined, across the KBO and NPB, Lee has also recorded more hits than any other native-born South Korean player.

Professional career
Lee started his career with the Samsung Lions of the KBO League in 1995 and played with them for nine seasons. He was the first player in the KBO League to hit 50 home runs in a season when he clubbed 54 in 1999. He set the single-season home run mark with 56 in 2003.

In 2004 Lee signed with the Chiba Lotte Marines of Japan's Pacific League for two years. He signed a one-year contract with the Yomiuri Giants for 210 million yen, including a 50 million yen signing bonus, for the 2006 season. He batted fourth and played first base there. He explicitly showed interest in making a move to Major League Baseball.

He had a slow start in Japan. Lee hit just 14 home runs and drove in 50 runs while batting .240 in 100 games. In the next season, he greatly improved, making 30 home runs and 82 RBI while batting .260 in 117 games.

He was selected to play for the Korea national baseball team in the inaugural World Baseball Classic in 2006. He batted .333 and led all players in the tournament with 5 home runs and 10 RBI. This has increased speculation that an MLB team might eventually sign him. However, Lee was under contract to play with the Yomiuri Giants for the 2006 season.

On 1 August 2006, Lee became only the third professional baseball player to hit 400 career home runs before the age of 30 (others include Sadaharu Oh and Alex Rodriguez). In the 2006 season, he batted .323 with 41 homers.

On 3 August 2006, a report on MLB Radio on XM satellite radio stated that the New York Yankees and Lee had agreed to start negotiations during the offseason after the 2006 regular season. The South Korean daily Chosun Ilbo had reported on July 19 that the Yankees had expressed interest in the slugger.

After the conclusion of the 2006 season, Lee re-signed with the Yomiuri Giants, citing that he wishes to win a Japan Series with the team. However, a clause allowed him to be a free agent if the Giants won the series.

After being released by the Giants at the end of the 2010 season, Lee joined the Orix Buffaloes of Japan's Pacific League in December 2010.

On 5 December 2011, Lee rejoined his former team Samsung Lions, signing a one-year deal.

He played with the Lions until his retirement at age 41 at the end of the 2017 season. Despite his age, Lee hit 143 home runs between 2012 and 2017. In his retirement game against the Nexen Heroes in October 2017, he hit two home runs.

2008 Summer Olympics
Lee played for the South Korean national team in the 2008 Summer Olympic Games in Beijing. Slowed down by an injury to his left thumb, Lee struggled in the preliminary rounds, limited to 3-for-22 (.136) with two runs batted in and no home runs, before coming alive in the medal round games against Japan and Cuba.

In the semifinal game against Japan, Lee hit a go-ahead two-run home run in the bottom of the eighth inning off reliever Hitoki Iwase, which proved to be the winning runs in Korea's 6–2 win.

In the gold medal game against Cuba, Lee hit a two-run home run in the first inning off Cuban starter Norberto González to help Korea defeat Cuba and win the gold medal.

Career statistics

Career statistics in KBO League

Career statistics in NPB

Filmography

Television shows

Awards and nominations

References

External links 

 
 Career statistics and player information from Korea Baseball Organization
 
 South Korea's Lee could be bound for majors 
 
 Lee Seung-yeop baseball cards at Korean Cardboard
 

1976 births
Living people
Sportspeople from Daegu
2006 World Baseball Classic players
2013 World Baseball Classic players
Asian Games gold medalists for South Korea
Asian Games medalists in baseball
Baseball players at the 2000 Summer Olympics
Baseball players at the 2002 Asian Games
Baseball players at the 2008 Summer Olympics
Chiba Lotte Marines players
Doosan Bears managers
KBO League first basemen
KBO League Most Valuable Player Award winners
Korean Series MVPs
Kyeongbuk High School alumni
Medalists at the 2000 Summer Olympics
Medalists at the 2002 Asian Games
Medalists at the 2008 Summer Olympics
Nippon Professional Baseball first basemen
Olympic baseball players of South Korea
Olympic bronze medalists for South Korea
Olympic gold medalists for South Korea
Olympic medalists in baseball
Orix Buffaloes players
Samsung Lions players
South Korean expatriate baseball players in Japan
Yomiuri Giants players